Norbert Hahn (born 6 January 1954 in Elbingerode, Saxony-Anhalt) is an East German former luger who competed from the mid-1970s to the early 1980s. He won two medals at the Winter Olympics in the men's doubles event (1976, 1980).

Hahn also won five medals in the men's doubles event at the FIL World Luge Championships with two golds (1975, 1977), two silvers (1973, 1979), and one bronze (1978). He also won seven medals in the men's doubles event at the FIL European Luge Championships with four golds (1973, 1975, 1978, 1980) and three silvers (1974, 1977, 1979).

References

1954 births
German male lugers
Living people
Lugers at the 1976 Winter Olympics
Lugers at the 1980 Winter Olympics
Olympic gold medalists for East Germany
Olympic lugers of East Germany
Olympic medalists in luge
Medalists at the 1976 Winter Olympics
Medalists at the 1980 Winter Olympics
People from Oberharz am Brocken
Sportspeople from Saxony-Anhalt
20th-century German people